Anderson's mabuya or nine-keeled sun skink (Toenayar novemcarinata) is a species of skink found in Asia. It is monotypic in the genus Toenayar.

Distribution
Found in the Sunda Islands, India, Thailand and Myanmar.

References

 Anderson, J. 1871 A list of the reptilian accession to the Indian Museum, Calcutta, from 1865 to 1870, with a description of some new species. J. Asiat. Soc. Bengal, Calcutta, 40, part 11(1): 12–39.
 The Reptile Database: Toenayar novemcarinata (ANDERSON, 1871)

Skinks
Reptiles described in 1871
Taxa named by John Anderson (zoologist)